Tim Jordan (born April 26, 1964) is a former linebacker in the National Football League (NFL). He was drafted in the fourth round of the 1987 NFL Draft by the New England Patriots and played three seasons with the team.

Early life
Jordan graduated from La Follette High School in Madison, Wisconsin, and attended the University of Wisconsin-Madison.

References

Sportspeople from Madison, Wisconsin
Players of American football from Wisconsin
New England Patriots players
American football linebackers
Wisconsin Badgers football players
1964 births
Living people